The 1970–71 1re série season was the 50th season of the 1re série, the top level of ice hockey in France. 10 teams participated in the league, and Chamonix Hockey Club won their 26th league title.

First round

Paris-Nord Group

Alpes-Provence Group

Qualification game for final round
 Ours de Villard-de-Lans - US Métro 9:4

Final round

External links
Season on hockeyarchives.info

France
1970–71 in French ice hockey
Ligue Magnus seasons